NCP Engineering (styled 'NCP engineering') is a Nuremberg-based company producing software for remote access, industrial internet of things security and information security. NCP's products use virtual private network (VPN) and other technologies like encryption, personal firewalls and electronic certificates in a public key infrastructure (PKI) to secure data communication.

NCP has made its IPsec VPN client compatible with the Windows 8, Windows 10, iOS, OS X, Linux and Android operating systems.

Name 

NCP is the abbreviation of "Network Communications Products". The supplement "Engineering" describes that the company produces software for in-house data processing.

History 
NCP Engineering was founded in Nuremberg, Germany in 1986. The company produces software for secure data communication through the Internet, networks) via 3G/4G and wireless LANs. At the core of NCP's business is provisioning secure communication connections between stationary and mobile end-devices as well as affiliate and branch networks to a company's headquarters.

In 2007, NCP partnered with WatchGuard Technologies.
 
In January 2010, NCP-E established a North American affiliate, NCP Engineering, Inc.

In February 2010, NCP Engineering was awarded US Patent 8811397 B2 for a "System and method for data communication between a user terminal and a gateway via a network node".

NCP Engineering has been involved in the ESUKOM project for the development of a real-time security solution that protects corporate networks using integrated security solutions based on a unified metadata format since 2010.

As a SIMU project partner (security information and event management for small SMEs), NCP Engineering is focused on optimizing IT security in corporate networks.

After many years of working together, in 2017 NCP Engineering and Juniper Networks have intensified their collaboration in a technology partnership.

References 

Companies based in Nuremberg
Virtual private networks
Companies established in 1986
Software companies of Germany